4 Sorry is a 2021 Indian Tamil-language anthology film, consisting of four short film segments directed by Sakthivel. Featuring John Vijay, Kaali Venkat and Sakshi Agarwal in leading roles, the film was released on 29 October 2021.

Cast 
John Vijay as Stephen
Kaali Venkat
Sakshi Agarwal as Yamuna
Riythvika as Selvi
Daniel Annie Pope as Boss
Sahana Sheddy as Pooja
Karthik Ashokan as Vivek
Sarpetta Muthukumar
R. N. R. Manohar

Soundtrack
Soundtrack was composed by Prasanna Sivaraman.
Aeriyil – Prasanna Sivaraman, Sushmitha Narasimhan
Kanna Nee – Ramya Sivaramakrishnan, Vijay Nagaraja
Sorry – Vignesh Raju

Release 
The film was released across Tamil Nadu on 29 October 2021. A critic from Maalai Malar gave the film a positive review, mentioning it was an "effort to be appreciated". Newspaper Thina Bhoomi also reviewed the film.

References

External links 
 

2021 films
Indian anthology films
2020s Tamil-language films
2021 romance films
Indian romance films